Russky Newsweek or Newsweek Russia was a news magazine published in Russia between 2004 and 2010 as the Russian edition of Newsweek. It was the first news magazine of Western origin published in the country.

History and profile
Russky Newsweek was established in June 2004. The license of the magazine was held by the Axel Springer Russia, a subsidiary of Axel Springer AG. The magazine was published on a weekly basis by Axel Springer Russia. The weekly featured detailed articles some of which were critical of Kremlin.

Leonid Parfyonov and  served as the editors-in-chief of Russky Newsweek. Between 2009 and 2010 Mikhail Zygar was its political editor and deputy editor-in-chief. Mikhail Fishman was the last editor-in-chief. The magazine was printed in light weight coated paper provided by LEIPA.

Russky Newsweek was the recipient of the Press Leaders-2008 award of the Association of Press Distributors in the category of general interest magazines.

The last issue of Russky Newsweek was published on 18 October 2010 when it ceased publication due to economic reasons.

References

2004 establishments in Russia
2010 disestablishments in Russia
Axel Springer SE
Defunct magazines published in Russia
Magazines established in 2004
Magazines disestablished in 2010
News magazines published in Russia
Newsweek
Russian-language magazines
Weekly magazines published in Russia